we

Sheikh Chilli is a Bollywood film about the eponymous Indian Sufi saint, Sheikh Chilli. It was released in 1942.

See also
 Sheikh Chilli's Tomb

References

External links
 

1942 films
1940s Hindi-language films
Indian fantasy comedy films
1940s fantasy comedy films
Indian black-and-white films
1942 comedy films
Indian biographical films
Indian historical comedy-drama films